The Overtake is an independent British news and opinion website aimed at millennials. The website was founded in October 2017 by Robyn Vinter and is based in Leeds. Vinter was nominated for the Georgia Henry Award for Innovation at the 2017 Press Awards for her work on The Overtake.

Content
The Overtake positions itself as an alternative and independent media website aimed at a millennial audience. Its articles consist of both investigative journalism pieces as well as opinion. Their investigative work has been featured by The Bureau of Investigative Journalism and their opinion work has been featured by Press Gazette and The Guardian.

References

External links
Official Website
Science News Article
Trending News Magazine

British news websites
Internet properties established in 2017
2017 establishments in the United Kingdom